Dodge County is a county in the U.S. state of Minnesota. The population was 20,867 as of the 2020 census. Its county seat is Mantorville.

Dodge County is part of the Rochester, MN Metropolitan Statistical Area.

History
The area of present Dodge County was a hunting and battle ground for the Mdewakanton Sioux, often fighting Sauk and Fox Indians who wandered into their territory. Possibly the first non-indigenous person to enter the territory was a French fur trader from Canada in 1655. After the fur trappers and early explorers, the area was populated by settlers from New England. The 1820s and 1830s saw significant emigration, eased by completion of the Erie Canal (1825) and the end of the Black Hawk War (1831). They brought a passion for education, establishing many schools, as well as staunch support for abolitionism. They were members of the Congregational or Episcopal church. Culturally Dodge County was similar to colonial New England during the nineteenth century. In 1853 government surveyors set lines for the townships. In 1854, two Mantor brothers and Eli P. Waterman established their claims in the area of present Mantorville. In early 1855, Dodge County was organized for local government. It was named for Henry Dodge, the first governor of Wisconsin (1836-1841).

The Minnesota State Constitution placed Dodge County in the Fifth Judicial District on May 11, 1858. The county courthouse was constructed in 1865; it is presently the oldest still-used courthouse in Minnesota. As the 20th century began, emigrants from Germany, Sweden and Norway flowed to Minnesota in increasing numbers. Their influence added Catholic and Lutheran influence to the cultural mix.

Geography
The South Branch of the Middle Fork of the Zumbro River flows east-northeast through the upper central part of Dodge County. Salem Creek and Harkcom Creek drain the county to the east. The county terrain consists of rolling hills, devoted to agriculture where possible. The terrain slopes to the northeast; its highest point is on the eastern part of its southern border, at 1,352' (412m) ASL.

The central and northern parts are hilly and thickly wooded with pebbly, loose soil that allows for wheat agriculture. The southern part, in contrast, is flat and wet, more suited to grazing livestock. The soil is very fertile, with heavy black loam. Dodge is one of seven southern Minnesota counties that have no forest ecosystems; only prairie and savanna soils exist here.

Dodge County's plentiful sand and rock also make the area a center for building. Quarries in Mantorville were once enterprises and consist of layers of thick stone that can be cut into any desired shape. Wasioja is known nationwide for its excellent "Wasioja stone."

Streams

 Dodge Center Creek
 Harkcom Creek
 Henslin Creek
 Little Cedar River
 Masten Creek
 Millikin Creek
 Salem Creek
 Tompkins Creek

Lakes
 Rice Lake (part)
 Zumbro River Reservoir

Major highways

  U.S. Highway 14
  U.S. Highway 218
  Minnesota State Highway 30
  Minnesota State Highway 56
  Minnesota State Highway 57

Airport
 Dodge Center Municipal Airport

Adjacent counties

 Rice County - northwest
 Goodhue County - northeast
 Olmsted County - east
 Mower County - south
 Steele County -west

Demographics

2000 census
As of the 2000 census, there were 17,731 people, 6,420 households, and 4,853 families in the county. The population density was 40.4/sqmi (15.6/km2). There were 6,642 housing units at an average density of 15.1/sqmi (5.84/km2). The racial makeup of the county was 96.58% White, 0.20% Black or African American, 0.17% Native American, 0.41% Asian, 0.01% Pacific Islander, 1.89% from other races, and 0.73% from two or more races. 2.99% of the population were Hispanic or Latino of any race. 34.2% were of German, 26.9% Norwegian, 5.8% Irish, 5.8% American and 5.1% English ancestry.

There were 6,420 households, out of which 40.70% had children under the age of 18 living with them, 64.70% were married couples living together, 7.20% had a female householder with no husband present, and 24.40% were non-families. 20.20% of all households were made up of individuals, and 9.70% had someone living alone who was 65 years of age or older. The average household size was 2.73 and the average family size was 3.15.

The county population contained 30.20% under the age of 18, 7.60% from 18 to 24, 29.90% from 25 to 44, 20.20% from 45 to 64, and 12.10% who were 65 years of age or older. The median age was 35 years. For every 100 females, there were 98.80 males. For every 100 females age 18 and over, there were 97.90 males.

The median income for a household in the county was $47,437, and the median income for a family was $54,261. Males had a median income of $34,195 versus $25,903 for females. The per capita income for the county was $19,259. About 4.40% of families and 5.80% of the population were below the poverty line, including 5.80% of those under age 18 and 9.60% of those age 65 or over.

2020 Census

Communities

Cities

 Blooming Prairie (partly in Steele County)
 Claremont
 Dodge Center
 Hayfield
 Kasson
 Mantorville (county seat)
 West Concord

Unincorporated communities

 Berne
 Concord
 Danesville (partial)
 Eden
 Oslo
 Rice Lake (ghost town)
 Wasioja

Townships

 Ashland Township
 Canisteo Township
 Claremont Township
 Concord Township
 Ellington Township
 Hayfield Township
 Mantorville Township
 Milton Township
 Ripley Township
 Vernon Township
 Wasioja Township
 Westfield Township

Politics
Dodge County voters have been reliably Republican for decades. In only one national election since 1964 has the county selected the Democratic Party candidate (as of 2020).

See also
 National Register of Historic Places listings in Dodge County, Minnesota

References

External links
 Dodge County government's website

 
Minnesota counties
Rochester metropolitan area, Minnesota
1855 establishments in Minnesota Territory